Loxodes is a genus of karyorelictean ciliates, belonging to family Loxodidae. It is the only known karyorelictean ciliate that lives in freshwater habitats.

The term Loxodes derives from the ancient greek , meaning "oblique, tilted".

Ecology 
Loxodes lives in freshwater habitats such as lakes and ponds, unlike other karyorelictean ciliates such as the other loxodid genus Remanella, which live in brackish-water or marine habitats. They feed on bacteria and protists such as microalgae. It is microaerobic, preferring low concentrations of oxygen, below 5% atmospheric saturation. It can also survive extended periods in anoxic water, where oxygen is absent. Under such conditions, Loxodes is able to use nitrate instead of oxygen as an electron acceptor for respiration. Nitrate respiration is rare among eukaryotes, and Loxodes was the first eukaryote known to have this capability. Loxodes is also sensitive to light.

Geotaxis 
Both genera in the family Loxodidae have organelles known as Müller (or Müllerian) vesicles, which are involved in the sensing of gravity. They are about 7 µm across, and contain a membrane-covered mineral body known as a statolith. In Loxodes, the statolith is mostly composed of barium salts, compared to Remanella, where they are mostly strontium. Its structure and function resembles the statocyst of some animals. Loxodes uses its Müller's vesicle to distinguish between up and down (geotaxis or gravitaxis), which it uses as a stimulus in addition to the oxygen concentration to orient itself in the water column. When oxygen concentrations are high, Loxodes tends to swim downwards, and vice versa.

Genetic code 
Loxodes uses a variant of the standard genetic code, where the stop codons UAA and UAG have been reassigned to the amino acid glutamine. This variant code is also used by other ciliates.

Cell cycle 
Unlike other ciliates, the macronuclei of karyorelicteans do not divide. This was first observed in Loxodes by Otto Bütschli in the 1870s. It was later shown to be a distinctive feature of the class Karyorelictea in general. Experiments on Loxodes have shown that little or no DNA synthesis occurs in their macronuclei, and that the DNA content of a macronucleus is only slightly more than that of a diploid micronucleus ("paradiploid").

References

External links 
 

Karyorelictea
Ciliate genera